Arcadi Arcadievich Volodos (Arkadij Arkadjevich Volodos; born 24 February 1972) is a Russian pianist and composer. His first name is sometimes transliterated Arcady or Arkady.

Biography 
Born in Leningrad in 1972, he began his musical training studying voice, following the example of his parents, who were singers, and later shifted his emphasis to conducting while a student at the Glinka Chapel School and the Saint Petersburg Conservatory. Though he had played the piano from the age of eight, he did not devote himself to serious study of the instrument until 1987. His formal piano training took place at the Moscow Conservatory Music College with Galina Eguiazarova. Volodos also studied at the Paris Conservatory with Jacques Rouvier. In Madrid, he studied at the Reina Sofía School of Music with Dimitri Bashkirov and Galina Eguiazarova.

Despite the relative brevity of his formal studies, Volodos has rapidly moved into the elite pantheon of the world's most distinguished pianists. Thomas Frost, the producer of many of Horowitz's recordings, and producer of Volodos' recordings for Sony Classical, has said that Volodos "has everything: imagination, colour, passion and a phenomenal technique to carry out his ideas."

Volodos received the German award Echo Klassik as the best instrumentalist of 2003; he received the Gramophone Award for best instrumental recording in 1999 for Arcadi Volodos Live at Carnegie Hall, in 2010 for Volodos in Vienna, in 2014 for Volodos plays Mompou, and in 2018 for Volodos plays Brahms.

His "Concert Paraphrase on Mozart's Turkish March" has been recorded by several other pianists.

Compositions

 Concert Paraphrase on Mozart's Turkish March, for piano (1997)
 Concert Paraphrase on Rachmaninoff's Polka italienne, for piano (2003)

Recordings
Volodos: Piano Transcriptions (1997), Sony Classical
Volodos, Live at Carnegie Hall (Recorded October 21, 1998, released 1999), Sony Classical 
Rachmaninoff: Piano Concerto No. 3 / Solo Piano Works (2000), Sony Classical 
Schubert: Solo Piano Works (2002), Sony Classical 
Tchaikovsky: Piano Concerto No. 1 / Rachmaninoff: Solo Piano Works (2003), Sony Classical 
Volodos Plays Liszt (2007), Sony Classical
Volodos in Vienna (2010) Recorded live on March 1, 2009 (works of Scriabin, Ravel, Schumann and Liszt), Sony Classical
Volodos plays Mompou (2013) Recorded October & December 2012, Sony Classical 
Volodos plays Brahms (2017), Sony Classical 
Volodos: Schubert Piano Sonata D.959 & Minuets D. 334, D. 335, D. 600 (2019), Sony Classical

References

External links and references
Official website
Arcadi Volodos website at Sony Classical

Russian classical pianists
Male classical pianists
1972 births
Living people
Reina Sofía School of Music alumni
Conservatoire de Paris alumni
Moscow Conservatory alumni
Saint Petersburg Conservatory alumni